Byers Canyon is a short gorge on the upper Colorado River in Grand County, Colorado in the United States. The canyon is approximately 8 miles (13 km) long and is located in the headwaters region of the Colorado between Hot Sulphur Springs and Kremmling. U.S. Highway 40 passes through the canyon between Hot Sulphur Springs and Kremmling. The Union Pacific Railroad's Moffat Route also travels through the short canyon.

See also
Gore Canyon

Canyons and gorges of Colorado
Landforms of Grand County, Colorado
Colorado River